Cà Giannino is a small village (curazia) of San Marino. It belongs to the municipality of Domagnano.

See also
Domagnano
Fiorina
Piandivello
Spaccio Giannoni
Torraccia

Curazie in San Marino
Domagnano